Leonard Olivier (born 19 January 1986 in Pretoria, South Africa) is a South African rugby union player, currently playing with French Fédérale 1 side Vannes. His regular position is fly-half.

Career

Youth

He played for the  side in 2005 and for the  side in 2005 and 2006.

Blue Bulls

He scored his first senior points within a minute of coming on when he slotted a conversion for the away side. Despite starting in just six of the ' thirteen matches (and being a substitute in six more), Olivier ended the season with a tally of 76 points, which put him joint-eleventh in the competition.

Falcons

He remained with the Falcons for two seasons and made more than 30 appearances in both the Vodacom Cup and Currie Cup competitions. However, he could not prevent the team getting relegated from the Premier Division of the Currie Cup at the end of the 2008 season.

Sharks

Montauban / Oyonnax / Colomiers

Olivier then went to France, where he joined Montauban for the 2009–10 Top 14 season. He made just six appearances and was released by the side after they were declared bankrupt at the end of the season.

He remained in France and joined Oyonnax for the 2011–12 Rugby Pro D2 season, appearing in 24 of their 30 matches during the season and scoring 170 points.

He moved clubs once again for the 2012–13 Rugby Pro D2 season, joining Colomiers, making eleven appearances.

Boland Cavaliers

Olivier returned to South Africa in 2013 by joining Wellington-based side  for the 2013 Currie Cup First Division competition. Olivier contributed 38 points during their campaign despite missing parts of the season through injury.

Griquas

In 2014, Olivier was included in the  squad for the 2014 Currie Cup qualification competition. However, he made no appearances for the side.

Vannes

He returned to France to join Fédérale 1 side Vannes for the 2014–2015 season where he played 17 games in that season taking his number of 1st class appearances over 100 in his career <itsrugby.com>

Rugby Coaching

Olivier started coaching in 2016 at the University of Pretoria where he coached the TUKS u/21 side. They won both the Assupol Blue Bulls Club Championship vs UJ & the Carlton Cup with the 2nd highest score of all time beating the Dragons 83 - 11.

Olivier was then promoted to coach the University of Pretoria 1st Team in 2017. They are currently through to the Semi finals of The CarltonCup.

He is now also the Head coach of the Elite Team at The Blue Bulls Tuks Rugby Academy. <bluebullstuksrugbyacademy.co.za/management>

Olivier has also decided to coach the Backline of The Limpopo Blue Bulls U/20 team. They are currently busy competing in the U/20 Currie Cup.

References

South African rugby union coaches
South African rugby union players
Living people
1986 births
Rugby union players from Pretoria
Rugby union fly-halves
Blue Bulls players
Boland Cavaliers players
Falcons (rugby union) players
Griquas (rugby union) players
Sharks (Currie Cup) players
South African expatriate rugby union players
Expatriate rugby union players in France
South African expatriate sportspeople in France
US Montauban players
Oyonnax Rugby players
US Colomiers players
Rugby Club Vannes players